High School Musical 2 is the soundtrack for the Disney Channel Original Movie of the same name. It was on August 14, 2007, by Walt Disney Records.

Debuting at number one on the Billboard 200 chart, the album sold 625,000 copies in its initial week of release. As of September 2007, this figure amounted to the fourth-biggest first week sales of the year. It was the first soundtrack of a television movie to debut at the Billboard summit. The album also shipped double platinum (2,000,000) copies in the U.S. in its first week of release. It was the best-selling album of 2007, with sales of over 2.96 million copies in the United States and 6 million copies worldwide. The album won Favorite Soundtrack Album at The American Music Awards of 2007.

The Wal-Mart Exclusive of the album was released on August 14, 2007, and contained the original soundtrack (albeit in a slightly different order) and an extra DVD, which seemingly contains most (if not all) episodes of "Road to High School Musical" and behind the scenes of iconic scenes such as “I Don't Dance”. The 2-disc Collector's edition version of the album released in Singapore on December 3, 2007.

Commercial performance
The album was the number-one most downloaded album on iTunes and Amazon.com on its first day of release, and remained so a week later.

The album debuted at number 1 on the U.S. Billboard 200 with sales of 615,000 copies, the fourth best first-week sales of 2007 (trailing behind Linkin Park's Minutes to Midnight, 50 Cent's Curtis, and Kanye West's Graduation). The set also claimed the biggest first-week sales for a television soundtrack. It remained at number-one in its second, third, and fourth weeks, selling 367,000 copies in its second, 210,000 copies in its third, and 165,000 copies in its fourth. The soundtrack is the first album in over two years to spend four consecutive weeks at number 1 on the Billboard 200.

After spending four consecutive weeks at number one on the Billboard 200, the album dropped to number four, following the releases of Kanye West's Graduation, 50 Cent's Curtis, and Kenny Chesney's Just Who I Am: Poets & Pirates, respectively. In its fifteenth week on the Billboard 200, during November 2007, High School Musical 2 returned to the top 10 with a 130% sales increase (183,000 copies), bringing it to number 6 and making it 2007's best-selling album, ahead of Daughtry. However, Daughtry held onto the spot, becoming 2007's biggest selling album. To date, it has sold 3.4 million copies in the US.

Track listing

Notes
 Olesya Rulin is featured in the song "You Are the Music in Me", but her name isn't officially credited.
 Lucas Grabeel recorded a song "You Got It" that is played in the movie. The song plays when Sharpay and Ryan pull up to the country club. The song is available to buy on iTunes and received heavy airplay on Radio Disney. However, it was never released physically. The song was first heard on Lucas Grabeel's MySpace page, but the song is a demo.
 On November 18, 2007, High School Musical 2 was awarded Best Soundtrack Album at the 35th Annual American Music Awards.

2-disc Collector's edition
For a limited time, Wal-Mart retailer stores only released an exclusive two-disc collector's edition of High School Musical 2. It included the soundtrack and a bonus DVD. The collector's edition is now available in the Philippines on the same release date of the soundtrack of High School Musical 3: Senior Year after Universal Music Limited became the newest licensee of Walt Disney Records in the said country. It includes:

Songs from the movie scenes

There are some untitled tracks.

Bonus
 Featuring exclusive footage of the cast recording and rehearsal sessions (45 minutes).
 High School Musical 2 Cast autographed mini-cards
 Special foil package with special insert lyric booklet

Other releases

High School Musical 2 Non-Stop Dance Party

Walt Disney Records released a remix album of all the High School Musical 2 tracks. It was released on December 26, 2007, in the U.S. and on December 24, 2007, in the UK and Southeast Asia. All songs are remixed by Jason Nevins. High School Musical 2: Non-Stop Dance Party reached number-one in the U.S. Top Electronic Albums chart in January 2008.

Box set
A box set called High School Musical: The Complete Collection, was released on November 20, 2007. It includes six discs. They include the High School Musical original soundtrack, High School Musical 2 original soundtrack, High School Musical Karaoke Vol. 1, High School Musical 2 Karaoke Vol. 2 and the High School Musical: The Concert CD/DVD.

High School Musical 2: Hindi Version

Times Music from India, launched a special Hindi 2-disc Special Edition Soundtrack of the original High School Musical 2 soundtrack. It contains an extra special disc with three special inspired songs from the famous music director trio Shankar–Ehsaan–Loy. These include "All for One" ("Aaaja Nachle"), "Ud Chale" and "Chhoti Si". These songs were also remixed by DJ Suketu and arranged by Aks. The soundtrack was released (as two disk collection) on October 26, 2007, and the movie (dubbed in Hindi) was aired on Disney Channel India on December 7, 2007. Two music videos from the special disc aired on Disney Channel India. The two are Ud Chale and "All for One" ("Aaja Nachle"). The music video for Ud Chale has three friends and together they explore the night sky. In All for One, many people bring their emotions to dance.

Chart positions

Weekly charts

Year-end charts

Certifications

International versions
These are international versions of the songs of High School Musical 2.

See also
High School Musical 2
High School Musical
High School Musical: El Desafio

References

Albums produced by Matthew Gerrard
Disney film soundtracks
High School Musical albums
2000s film soundtrack albums
2007 soundtrack albums
Walt Disney Records soundtracks
Cast recordings
Television soundtracks

es:Mota